Aida is an opera by Giuseppe Verdi.

Aida or AIDA may also refer to:

Computer science
 AIDA64, computer software that provides information on hardware
 AIDA32, computer software that provides information on hardware
 AIDA (computing), a set of defined interfaces and formats for representing common data analysis objects, primarily used by researchers in high-energy particle physics
 AIDA/Web, a Smalltalk open source web application framework

Places
 Aida, Okayama, a former town in Japan, known for the "Aida" race car circuit 
Okayama International Circuit, formerly known as TI Circuit Aida, a race car circuit which hosted the Formula One Pacific Grand Prix in 1994 and 1995
 Aida Junior High School
 Aida District, Okayama, Japan
 Aida (camp), a Palestinian refugee camp

Fiction
 AIDA (.hack), fictional AIs in the .hack franchise
 AIDA (comics), a fictional Life-Model Decoy from Marvel's Agents of S.H.I.E.L.D.
 Aida, a character from the Cairo Trilogy by Naquib Mahfouz
 Aida, a playable map in Mu Online
 Aïda, a character in the Neal Stephenson novel Seveneves
 Aida, a character in Unreal II: The Awakening

Film and television
 Aida (1911 film), an American drama film
 Aida (1953 film), a film starring Sophia Loren
 Aida (1987 film), a Swedish film
 Aida (2015 film), a Moroccan film
 Aída, a Spanish TV series

Music
 Aida (musical), a musical by Elton John and Tim Rice
 Aida (album), a 1980 album by Derek Bailey
 Aida (Rino Gaetano album), a 1977 album by Rino Gaetano

Organisations
 Aida (café), a chain of coffeehouses in Vienna, Austria
 AIDA Cruises, a German cruise company, also the prefix of several ships in their fleet
 AIDA Hellas, a Greek non-profit organization for freediving
 AIDA International, an organizing body for freediving
 American Indian Defense Association, an American indigenous rights organization
 , an international environmental law organization working in the Americas
 Australasian Intervarsity Debating Association, an organizing body of the Australasian Intervarsity Debating Championships
  Australian Indigenous Doctors’ Association, a member of the Lowitja Institute
 Azerbaijan International Development Agency, an organizing body for international aid by the Republic of Azerbaijan

 International Association of Arabic Dialectology (AIDA)

Other uses
 Aida (given name), a female given name (including a list of persons with the name)
 Aida (surname), a surname (including a list of persons with the name)
 Aida (horse), a racehorse
 AIDA (marketing), an acronym for "Attention, Interest, Desire, Action"
 AIDA (international space cooperation), initially AIM and DART space missions, then Hera and DART space missions
 AIDA interactive educational freeware diabetes simulator
 Operation Aida, a WWII German operation
 Aida cloth, a cloth used in cross-stitch

See also
 After Aida, a 1985 play-with-music by Julian Mitchell
 AIDAdiva, a 2007 German cruise ship
 Ask Aida, a cooking show on the Food Network
 Celeste Aida, a romanza from the first act Aida by Giuseppe Verdi
 Fascinating Aïda, a British comedy singing group and satirical cabaret act
 Ida (disambiguation)
 Men in Aida, a homophonic translation of Book One of Homer's Iliad
 Ptosanthus aida, a species of fruit fly in the family Tephritidae
 Quo Vadis, Aida?, a 2020 Bosnian war drama film